Get That Girl is a 1932 American pre-Code mystery film directed by George Crone and starring Richard Talmadge, Shirley Grey and Fred Malatesta.

Plot
Dick Bartlett encounters Ruth Dale on a train and they gradually bond despite her initial suspicions of him. She has recently received a warning telegram and at first thinks he may be following her. When she disappears from the train, he discovers that she is due for a large inheritance and has been kidnapped to prevent her claiming it. Ruth has been taken to an isolate sanatorium run by a mad doctor who tries to turn women into mannequins. If she is held there long enough she was forfeit the inheritance, but Dick manages to trail her there in order to stage a rescue.

Cast
 Richard Talmadge as 	Dick Bartlett
 Shirley Grey as 	Ruth Dale
 Fred Malatesta as 	Dr. Sandro Tito
 Carl Stockdale as 	Leader of the Kidnap Plot
 Lloyd Ingraham as John, the Gardener
 Geneva Mitchell as Mme. Nedra Tito
 Victor Metzetti as Henchman Schultz 
 Billy Jones as 	Mike - Short Hencman
 James Guilfoyle as The Plumber 
 Lydia Knott as 	Old Lady on Train 
 Arthur Metzetti as Henchman
 Otto Metzetti as 	Henchman

References

Bibliography
 Pitts, Michael R. Poverty Row Studios, 1929–1940: An Illustrated History of 55 Independent Film Companies, with a Filmography for Each. McFarland & Company, 2005.
 Rigby, Jonathan. American Gothic: Sixty Years of Horror Cinema. Reynolds & Hearn, 2007.

External links

1932 films
American mystery films
1932 mystery films
American black-and-white films
Films directed by George Crone
1930s English-language films
1930s American films